French fries (North American English), chips (British English and other national varieties),  finger chips (Indian English), french-fried potatoes, or simply fries, are batonnet or allumette-cut deep-fried potatoes of disputed origin from Belgium or France. They are prepared by cutting potatoes into even strips, drying them, and frying them, usually in a deep fryer. Pre-cut, blanched, and frozen russet potatoes are widely used, and sometimes baked in a regular or convection oven; air fryers are small convection ovens marketed for frying potatoes.

French fries are served hot, either soft or crispy, and are generally eaten as part of lunch or dinner or by themselves as a snack, and they commonly appear on the menus of diners, fast food restaurants, pubs, and bars. They are often salted and may be served with ketchup, vinegar, mayonnaise, tomato sauce, or other local specialities. Fries can be topped more heavily, as in the dishes of poutine or chili cheese fries. French fries can be made from sweet potatoes instead of potatoes. A baked variant, oven fries, uses less or no oil.

Preparation

The standard method for cooking french fries is deep frying, which submerges them in hot fat, nowadays most commonly oil. Vacuum fryers produce potato chips with lower oil content, while maintaining their colour and texture.

The potatoes are prepared by first cutting them (peeled or unpeeled) into even strips, which are then wiped off or soaked in cold water to remove the surface starch, and thoroughly dried. They may then be fried in one or two stages. Chefs generally agree that the two-bath technique produces better results. Potatoes fresh out of the ground can have too high a water content resulting in soggy fries, so preference is for those that have been stored for a while.

In the two-stage or two-bath method, the first bath, sometimes called blanching, is in hot fat (around 160 °C/320 °F) to cook the fries through. This step can be done in advance. Then they are more briefly fried in very hot fat (190 °C/375 °F) to crisp the exterior. They are then placed in a colander or on a cloth to drain, then served. The exact times of the two baths depend on the size of the fries. For example, for 2–3 mm strips, the first bath takes about 3 minutes, and the second bath takes only seconds.

Since the 1960s, most french fries in the US have been produced from frozen Russet potatoes which have been blanched or at least air-dried industrially. The usual fat for making french fries is vegetable oil. In the past, beef suet was recommended as superior, with vegetable shortening as an alternative. McDonald's used a mixture of 93% beef tallow and 7% cottonseed oil until 1990, when they changed to vegetable oil with beef flavouring. Horse fat was standard in northern France and Belgium until recently, and is recommended by some chefs.

Chemical and physical changes 
French fries are fried in a two-step process: the first time is to cook the starch throughout the entire cut at low heat, and the second time is to create the golden crispy exterior of the fry at a higher temperature. This is necessary because if the potato cuts are only fried once, the temperature would either be too hot, causing only the exterior to be cooked and not the inside, or not hot enough where the entire fry is cooked, but its crispy exterior will not develop. Although the potato cuts may be baked or steamed as a preparation method, this section will only focus on french fries made using frying oil. During the initial frying process (approximately 150 °C), water on the surface of the cuts evaporates off the surface and the water inside the cuts gets absorbed by the starch granules, causing them to swell and produce the fluffy interior of the fry.

The starch granules are able to retain the water and expand due to gelatinisation. The water and heat break the glycosidic linkages between amylopectin and amylose strands, allowing a new gel matrix to form via hydrogen bonds which aid in water retention. The moisture that gets trapped in between the gel matrix is responsible for the fluffy interior of the fry. The gelatinised starch molecules move towards the surface of the fries "forming a thick layer of gelatinised starch" and this layer of pre-gelatinised starch will turn into the crispy exterior after the potato cuts are fried for a second time. During the second frying process (approximately 180 °C), the remaining water on the surface of the cuts will evaporate and the gelatinised starch molecules that collected towards the potato surface are cooked again, forming the crispy exterior. The golden-brown colour of the fry will develop when the amino acids and glucose on the exterior participate in a Maillard browning reaction.

Etymology

In the United States and most of Canada, the term french fries, sometimes capitalised as French fries, or shortened to fries, refers to all dishes of fried elongated pieces of potatoes.  in shape and size may have names such as curly fries, shoestring fries, etc.

In the United Kingdom, Australia, South Africa, Ireland and New Zealand, the term chips is generally used instead, though thinly cut fried potatoes are sometimes called french fries or skinny fries, to distinguish them from chips, which are cut thicker. In the US or Canada these more thickly-cut chips might be called steak fries, depending on the shape. The word chips is more often used in North America to refer to potato chips, known in the UK and Ireland as crisps.

Thomas Jefferson had "potatoes served in the French manner" at a White House dinner in 1802. The expression "french fried potatoes" first occurred in print in English in the 1856 work Cookery for Maids of All Work by E. Warren: "French Fried Potatoes. – Cut new potatoes in thin slices, put them in boiling fat, and a little salt; fry both sides of a light golden brown colour; drain." This account referred to thin, shallow-fried slices of potato. It is not clear where or when the now familiar deep-fried batons or fingers of potato were first prepared. In the early 20th century, the term "french fried" was being used in the sense of "deep-fried" for foods like onion rings or chicken.

One story about the name "french fries" claims that when the American Expeditionary Forces arrived in Belgium during World War I, they assumed that chips were a French dish because French was spoken in the Belgian Army. But the name existed long before that in English, and the popularity of the term did not increase for decades after 1917. At that time, the term "french fries" was growing in popularity, the term was already used in the United States as early as 1899, although it is not clear whether this referred to batons (chips) or slices of potato e.g. in an item in Good Housekeeping which specifically references "Kitchen Economy in France": "The perfection of French fries is due chiefly to the fact that plenty of fat is used".

Origin

In 1673, Chilean Francisco Núñez de Pineda mentioned eating "papas fritas" in 1629, but it is not known what exactly these were. Fries may have been invented in Spain, the first European country in which the potato appeared from the New World colonies. Professor Paul Ilegems, curator of the Frietmuseum in Bruges, Belgium, believes that Saint Teresa of Ávila of Spain cooked the first french fries, and refers also to the tradition of frying in Mediterranean cuisine as evidence.

Belgian food historian Pierre Leclercq has traced the history of the french fry and asserts that "it is clear that fries are of French origin". Fries are first mentioned in 1775 in a Parisian book, and the first recipe for modern French fries is in the French cookbook La cuisinière républicaine in 1795. They became an emblematic Parisian dish in the 19th century. Frédéric Krieger, a Bavarian musician, learned to cook fries at a roaster on rue Montmartre in Paris in 1842, and took the recipe to Belgium in 1844, where he would create his business Fritz and sell "la pomme de terre frite à l'instar de Paris", 'Paris-style fried potatoes'. The modern style of fries born in Paris around 1855 is different from the domestic fried potato that existed in the 18th century.

The French and Belgians have an ongoing dispute about where fries were invented.

The myth of Belgian fries dates from around 1985. From the Belgian standpoint, the popularity of the term "french fries" is explained as "French gastronomic hegemony" into which the cuisine of Belgium was assimilated, because of a lack of understanding coupled with a shared language and geographic proximity of the countries. The Belgian journalist  claimed that a 1781 family manuscript recounts that potatoes were deep-fried prior to 1680 in the Meuse valley, as a substitute for frying fish when the rivers were frozen. Gérard never produced the manuscript that supports this claim, and "the historical value of this story is open to question". In any case, it is unrelated to the later history of the french fry, as the potato did not arrive in the region until around 1735. In any case, given 18th-century economic conditions: "it is absolutely unthinkable that a peasant could have dedicated large quantities of fat for cooking potatoes. At most they were sautéed in a pan".

Global use 
"Pommes frites" or just "frites" (French), "frieten" (a word used in Flanders and the southern provinces of the Netherlands) or "patat" (used in the north and central parts of the Netherlands) became the national snack and a substantial part of several national dishes, such as Moules-frites or Steak-frites. Fries are very popular in Belgium, where they are known as frieten (in Dutch) or frites (in French), and the Netherlands, where among the working classes they are known as patat in the north and, in the south, friet(en). In Belgium, fries are sold in shops called friteries (French), frietkot/frituur (Belgian Dutch), snackbar (Dutch in The Netherlands) or Fritüre/Frittüre (German). They are served with a large variety of Belgian sauces and eaten either on their own or with other snacks. Traditionally fries are served in a cornet de frites (French), patatzak /frietzak/fritzak (Dutch/Flemish), or Frittentüte (German), a white cardboard cone, then wrapped in paper, with a spoonful of sauce (often mayonnaise) on top.

In France and other French-speaking countries, fried potatoes are formally pommes de terre frites, but more commonly pommes frites, patates frites, or simply frites. The words aiguillettes ("needle-ettes") or allumettes ("matchsticks") are used when the french fries are very small and thin. One enduring origin story holds that french fries were invented by street vendors on the Pont Neuf bridge in Paris in 1789, just before the outbreak of the French Revolution. However, a reference exists in France from 1775 to "a few pieces of fried potato" and to "fried potatoes". Eating potatoes for sustenance was promoted in France by Antoine-Augustin Parmentier, but he did not mention fried potatoes in particular. A note in a manuscript in U.S. president Thomas Jefferson's hand (circa 1801–1809) mentions "Pommes de terre frites à cru, en petites tranches" ("Potatoes deep-fried while raw, in small slices"). The recipe almost certainly comes from his French chef, Honoré Julien. 
The thick-cut fries are called pommes Pont-Neuf or simply pommes frites (about 10 mm); thinner variants are pommes allumettes (matchstick potatoes; about 7 mm), and pommes paille (potato straws; 3–4 mm). (Roughly 0.4, 0.3 and 0.15 inch respectively.) Pommes gaufrettes are waffle fries. A popular dish in France is steak frites, which is steak accompanied by thin french fries.
French fries migrated to the German-speaking countries during the 19th century. Since the 1950s, currywurst has become a widely-popular dish that is commonly offered with fries. They are occasionally made from unpeeled potatoes (skins showing). British chips are not the same thing as potato chips (an American term); those are called "crisps" in the UK and some other countries. In the UK, chips are part of the popular, and now international, fast food dish fish and chips. In the UK, the name "chips" is correct for both thick and thin cut, but chips are considered by some to be a separate item to french fries, with chips being thicker cut than french fries, they are generally cooked only once and at a lower temperature. From 1813 on, recipes for deep-fried cut potatoes occur in popular cookbooks. By the late 1850s, at least one cookbook refers to "French Fried Potatoes".

The first commercially available chips in the UK were sold by Mrs 'Granny' Duce in one of the West Riding towns in 1854. A blue plaque in Oldham marks the origin of the fish-and-chip shop, and thus the start of the fast food industry in Britain. In Scotland, chips were first sold in Dundee: "in the 1870s, that glory of British gastronomy – the chip – was first sold by Belgian immigrant Edward De Gernier in the city's Greenmarket". In Ireland the first chip shop was "opened by Giuseppe Cervi", an Italian immigrant, "who arrived there in the 1880s". It was estimated in 2011 that in the UK, 80% of households bought frozen chips each year. Although chips were a popular dish in most Commonwealth countries, the "thin style" french fries have been popularised worldwide in large part by the large American fast food chains such as McDonald's and Burger King.

In the United States, the J. R. Simplot Company is credited with successfully commercialising french fries in frozen form during the 1940s. Subsequently, in 1967, Ray Kroc of McDonald's contracted the Simplot company to supply them with frozen fries, replacing fresh-cut potatoes. In 2004, 29% of the United States' potato crop was used to make frozen fries; 90% consumed by the food services sector and 10% by retail. The United States is also known for supplying China with most of their french fries as 70% of China's french fries are imported. Pre-made french fries have been available for home cooking since the 1960s, having been pre-fried (or sometimes baked), frozen and placed in a sealed plastic bag. Some fast-food chains dip the fries in a sugar solution or a starch batter, to alter the appearance or texture. French fries are one of the most popular dishes in the United States, commonly being served as a side dish to main dishes and in fast food restaurants.

The town of Florenceville-Bristol, New Brunswick in Canada, headquarters of McCain Foods, calls itself "the French fry capital of the world" and also hosts a museum about potatoes called Potato World. McCain Foods is the world's largest manufacturer of frozen french fries and other potato specialities.

French fries are the main ingredient in the Québécois dish known  as poutine, a dish consisting of fried potatoes covered with cheese curds and brown gravy. Poutine has a growing number of variations, but it is generally considered to have been developed in rural Québec sometime in the 1950s, although precisely where in the province it first appeared is a matter of contention. Canada is also responsible for providing 22% of China's french fries.

In Spain, fried potatoes are called patatas fritas or papas fritas. Another common form, involving larger irregular cuts, is patatas bravas. The potatoes are cut into big chunks, partially boiled and then fried. They are usually seasoned with a spicy tomato sauce. Fries are a common side dish in Latin American cuisine or part of larger preparations such as the salchipapas in Peru or chorrillana in Chile.

Whilst eating 'regular' crispy french fries is common in South Africa, a regional favourite, particularly in Cape Town, is a soft soggy version doused in white vinegar called "slap-chips" (pronounced "slup-chips" in English or "slaptjips" in Afrikaans). These chips are typically thicker and fried at a lower temperature for a longer period of time than regular french fries. Slap-chips are an important component of a Gatsby sandwich, also a common Cape Town delicacy. Slap-chips are also commonly served with deep fried fish which are also served with the same white vinegar.

 is a standard fast food side dish in Japan. Inspired by Japanese cuisine, okonomiyaki fries are served with a topping of unagi sauce, mayonnaise, katsuobushi, nori seasoning (furikake) and stir-fried cabbage.

Variants

French fries come in multiple variations and toppings. Some examples include:
 Air-fried fries – fries cooked in an air fryer
 Carne asada fries – fries covered with carne asada, guacamole, sour cream and cheese.
 Cheese fries – fries covered with cheese.
 Chili cheese fries – fries covered with chili and cheese.
 Crinkle-cut fries – also known as "wavy fries", these are cut in a corrugated, ridged fashion.
 Curly fries – characterised by their helical shape, cut from whole potatoes using a specialised spiral slicer.
 Curry chips – fries covered in curry sauce.
 Dirty fries – fries covered in melted cheese with various toppings such as bacon, pulled pork, chili or gravy.
 French fry sandwich – such as the chip butty, horseshoe sandwich, french tacos, and the mitraillette.
 Kimchi fries – fries topped with caramelised baechu-kimchi and green onions
 Microwave fries – fries that are cooked in the microwave; some frozen fries have instructions for microwaving.
 Oven fries – fries that are cooked in the oven as a final step in the preparation.
 Potato wedges – thick-cut, elongated wedge-shaped fries with the skin left on.
 Poutine – a dish consisting of fries topped with cheese curds and gravy and principally associated with the Canadian province of Québec.
 Shoestring fries – thin-cut fries.
 Steak fries – thick-cut fries.
 Sweet potato fries – fries made with sweet potatoes instead of traditional white potatoes.
 Tornado fries – spiral-cut potatoes that are placed on a skewer and then deep fried.
 Triple-cooked chips – fries that are simmered, cooled and drained using a low-temp-long-time (LTLT) cooking technique; they are then deep fried at just 130 °C, cooled and finally deep fried at 180 °C.
 Waffle fries – lattice-shaped fries obtained by quarter-turning the potato before each next slide over a grater and deep-frying just once.

Accompaniments

Fries tend to be served with a variety of accompaniments, such as salt and vinegar (malt, balsamic or white), pepper, Cajun seasoning, grated cheese, melted cheese, mushy peas, heated curry sauce, curry ketchup, hot sauce, relish, mustard, mayonnaise, bearnaise sauce, tartar sauce, chili, tzatziki, feta cheese, garlic sauce, fry sauce, butter, sour cream, ranch dressing, barbecue sauce, gravy, honey, aioli, brown sauce, ketchup, lemon juice, piccalilli, pickled cucumber, pickled gherkins, pickled onions or pickled eggs.  In Australia, a popular flavouring added to chips is chicken salt.

Nutrition

French fries primarily contain carbohydrates (mostly in the form of starch) and protein from the potato, and fat absorbed during the deep-frying process. Salt, which contains sodium, is almost always applied as a surface seasoning. For example, a large serving of french fries at McDonald's in the United States is 154 grams and includes 350 mg of sodium. The 510 calories come from 66 g of carbohydrates, 24 g of fat and 7 g of protein.

A number of experts have criticised french fries for being very unhealthy. According to Jonathan Bonnet in a Time magazine article, "fries are nutritionally unrecognizable from a spud" because they "involve frying, salting, and removing one of the healthiest parts of the potato: the skin, where many of the nutrients and fiber are found." Kristin Kirkpatrick calls french fries "an extremely starchy vegetable dipped in a fryer that then loads on the unhealthy fat, and what you have left is a food that has no nutritional redeeming value in it at all." David Katz states that "French fries are often the super-fatty side dish to a burger—and both are often used as vehicles for things like sugar-laced ketchup and fatty mayo." Eric Morrissette, spokesperson for Health Canada, states that people should limit their intake of french fries, but eating them occasionally is not likely to be a health concern.

Frying french fries in beef tallow, lard, or other animal fats adds saturated fat to them. Replacing animal fats with tropical vegetable oils, such as palm oil, simply substitutes one saturated fat for another. For many years partially hydrogenated vegetable oils were used as a means of avoiding cholesterol and reducing saturated fatty acid content, but in time the trans fat content of these oils was perceived as contributing to cardiovascular disease. Starting in 2008, many restaurant chains and manufacturers of pre-cooked frozen french fries for home reheating phased out trans fat containing vegetable oils.

French fries contain some of the highest levels of acrylamides of any foodstuff, and experts have raised concerns about the effects of acrylamides on human health. According to the American Cancer Society, it is not clear  whether acrylamide consumption affects people's risk of getting cancer. A meta-analysis indicated that dietary acrylamide is not related to the risk of most common cancers, but could not exclude a modest association for kidney, endometrial or  ovarian cancers. A lower-fat method for producing a french fry-like product is to coat "frenched" or wedge potatoes in oil and spices/flavouring before baking them. The temperature will be lower compared to deep frying, which reduces acrylamide formation.

Legal issues
In June 2004, the United States Department of Agriculture (USDA), with the advisement of a federal district judge from Beaumont, Texas, classified batter-coated french fries as a vegetable under the Perishable Agricultural Commodities Act. This was primarily for trade reasons; french fries do not meet the standard to be listed as a processed food. This classification, referred to as the "French fry rule", was upheld in the United States Court of Appeals for the Fifth Circuit case Fleming Companies, Inc. v. USDA.

Environmental impact
A 2022 journal article published in the Proceedings of the National Academy of Sciences (PNAS) estimated the environmental impact of 57,000 food products and found french fries to have a lower environmental impact than many other foods.

See also

 Avocado fries
 Freedom fries
 French fry vending machine
 German fries
 Potato wedges
 List of deep fried foods
 Mitraillette
 Pommes dauphine
 Pommes duchesse
 Pommes soufflées

Citations

General bibliography

External links 

 

 
Belgian cuisine
British cuisine
Canadian cuisine
Fast food
French cuisine
German cuisine
Irish cuisine
Australian cuisine
New Zealand cuisine
National dishes
Snack foods
South African cuisine
Spanish cuisine
American vegetable dishes